Nealcidion is a genus of beetles in the family Cerambycidae, containing the following species:

 Nealcidion adjunctum (Thomson, 1865)
 Nealcidion albatum Monné & Delfino, 1986
 Nealcidion albolineatum Monne & Monne, 2009
 Nealcidion alboplagiatum (Martins & Monné, 1974)
 Nealcidion antennatum Monne & Monne, 2009
 Nealcidion armatum Monné & Delfino, 1986
 Nealcidion badium Monné & Delfino, 1986
 Nealcidion batesi (Kirsch, 1889)
 Nealcidion bicristatum (Bates, 1863)
 Nealcidion bispinum (Bates, 1863)
 Nealcidion brachiale (Bates, 1872)
 Nealcidion bruchi (Melzer, 1934)
 Nealcidion cereicola (Fisher, 1936)
 Nealcidion costatum (Monné & Martins, 1976)
 Nealcidion coxale (Kirsch, 1889)
 Nealcidion cristulatum Monné & Delfino, 1986
 Nealcidion cuspidatum Monné, 1998
 Nealcidion cyllenoide (Aurivillius, 1925)
 Nealcidion decoratum (Melzer, 1932)
 Nealcidion elegans Monne & Monne, 2009
 Nealcidion elongatum Monné, 1998
 Nealcidion emeritum (Erichson, 1847)
 Nealcidion eulophum (Bates, 1881)
 Nealcidion femoratum (Monné & Martins, 1976)
 Nealcidion formosum (Monné & Martins, 1976)
 Nealcidion furciferum (Bates, 1881)
 Nealcidion griseum (Aurivillius, 1900)
 Nealcidion humerosum (Bates, 1880)
 Nealcidion hylaeanum (Monné & Martins, 1976)
 Nealcidion interrogationis (Bates, 1863)
 Nealcidion laetulum (Bates, 1880)
 Nealcidion latipenne (Bates, 1863)
 Nealcidion latum (Thomson, 1860)
 Nealcidion lineatum (Bates, 1863)
 Nealcidion melasmum Monné & Delfino, 1986
 Nealcidion meridanum Monné & Delfino, 1986
 Nealcidion minimum (Bates, 1863)
 Nealcidion murinum Monné, 1998
 Nealcidion nebulosum (Bates, 1880)
 Nealcidion oculatum (Bates, 1863)
 Nealcidion omissum (Martins & Monné, 1974)
 Nealcidion parallelum (Monné & Martins, 1976)
 Nealcidion privatum (Pascoe, 1866)
 Nealcidion pulchrum (Bates, 1880)
 Nealcidion quinquemaculatum (Tippmann, 1960)
 Nealcidion scutellatum (Bates, 1881)
 Nealcidion sexguttatum Monné & Delfino, 1986
 Nealcidion sexnotatum (Waterhouse, 1901)
 Nealcidion silvai Monné & Delfino, 1986
 Nealcidion simillimum (Melzer, 1932)
 Nealcidion singulare Monné, 1998
 Nealcidion socium (Gahan, 1895)
 Nealcidion spinosum Monné & Delfino, 1986
 Nealcidion strigilis (Erichson, 1847)
 Nealcidion triangulare (Bates, 1863)
 Nealcidion trivittatum (Bates, 1863)
 Nealcidion venosum (Bates, 1880)

References

 
Acanthocinini